This is a list (alphabetized by binomial species name) of locust species of the taxonomic family Acrididae capable of density-dependent phase polyphenism and swarming behavior, potentially inflicting massive damage to crops.

 Aiolopus simulatrix - Sudan plague locust of eastern Sudan
 Anacridium aegyptium - Egyptian locust of Europe, northern Africa and Central Asia
 Anacridium melanorhodon - Sahelian tree locust of Sahel region of Africa
 Anacridium wernerellum - Sudan tree locust of Sudanese vegetation zone
 Austracris guttulosa - Spur-throated locust of Australia
 Austroicetes cruciata - Small plague grasshopper of Australia
 Calliptamus italicus - Italian locust of semi-deserts and steppes of Morocco, central Europe and Central Asia
 Ceracris kiangsu - Yellow-spined bamboo locust of Indo-China and southern China
 Chortoicetes terminifera - Australian plague locust of Australia
 Dissosteira longipennis - High plains locust of North America (formed large swarms as recently as the 1930s but never since)
 Dociostaurus maroccanus - Moroccan locust of semi-deserts and steppes of Morocco, North Africa, southern and eastern Europe, Middle East and western Asia
 Gastrimargus musicus - Yellow-winged locust of Australia
 Gomphocerus sibiricus - Siberian locust of Siberia and high mountains of Europe
 Locusta migratoria - Migratory locust of Asia, Africa and eastern Europe
 Locustana pardalina - Brown locust of Southern Africa
 Melanoplus differentialis - Differential grasshopper of Northern Mexico, central USA and southern Ontario, Canada
 Melanoplus sanguinipes - Migratory grasshopper of Caribbean and North America
 Melanoplus spretus - Rocky Mountain locust of North America (now extinct)
 Nomadacris septemfasciata - Red locust of southern and south central Africa
 Nomadacris succincta - Bombay locust of India and Southeast Asia
 Oedaleus senegalensis - Senegalese grasshopper of Sahel region of Africa, the Canary Islands, Cape Verde Islands and West Asia
 Rhammatocerus schistocercoides - Mato Grosso locust of Brazil
 Schistocerca cancellata - South American locust of South America
 Schistocerca gregaria - Desert locust of deserts of western Africa, northern Africa and western India
 Schistocerca piceifrons - Central American locust of Central America
 Schistocerca interrita - Peru locust of western South America
 Trimerotropis pallidipennis - Pallid-winged grasshopper of western North America

References

 
 

 List of species
Locust